The Unification of Norway (Norwegian Bokmål: Rikssamlingen) is the process by which Norway merged from several petty kingdoms into a single kingdom, predecessor to modern Kingdom of Norway.

History 
King Harald Fairhair is the monarch who is credited by later tradition as having first unified Norway into one kingdom. According to the sagas, he ruled Norway from approximately 872 to 930. Modern historians, including Claus Krag, assume that his rule may have been limited to the coastal areas of western and southern Norway. The tendency in recent research has been to perceive unification of the nation to have been a more time-consuming process.

The sagas recount that Harald succeeded, on the death of his father Halfdan the Black Gudrödarson, to the sovereignty of several small, and somewhat scattered kingdoms in Vestfold, which had come into his father's hands through conquest and inheritance. In 866, Harald made the first of a series of conquests over the many petty kingdoms which would compose Norway, including Värmland in Sweden, and modern day south-eastern Norway, which had sworn allegiance to the Swedish king Erik Eymundsson. In 872, after a great victory at the Battle of Hafrsfjord  near Stavanger, Harald found himself king over the whole country.

According to Sverre Bagge, unification of Norway was made easy by excellent sea communications, as well as seas that rarely froze in winter.

His realm was, however, threatened by dangers from outside, as large numbers of his opponents had taken refuge, not only in Iceland, then recently discovered; but also in the Orkney Islands, Shetland Islands, Hebrides Islands and Faroe Islands. His opponents' leaving was not entirely voluntary. Many Norwegian chieftains who were wealthy and respected posed a threat to Harald; therefore, they were subjected to much harassment, prompting them to vacate the land. In time, Harald was forced to make an expedition to subdue these islands.

After Harald's death, the unity of the kingdom was not preserved. In following centuries, the kingdom was variously ruled, wholly or in part, by descendants of King Harald or by earls under the suzerainty of Denmark. Kings of Norway until King Olav IV, who died in 1387, commonly claimed descent from Harald Fairhair.

Saga descriptions 
In the Saga of Harald Hårfagre from Heimskringla by Snorri Sturluson, the consolidation of the rule of Norway by Harald Fairhair was somewhat of a love story. The tale begins with a marriage proposal that resulted in rejection and scorn from Gyda, the daughter of Eirik, king of Hordaland. She said she refused to marry Harald "before he was king over all of Norway". Harald was therefore induced to take a vow not to cut nor comb his hair until he was sole king of Norway, and that ten years later, he was justified in trimming it; whereupon he exchanged the epithet "Shockhead" or "Tanglehair" for the one by which he is usually known. Most scholars today regard this story as a literary tale inspired by the Romance stories that were popular at the courts by the time Heimskringla was written.

Maps of the Norwegian kingdoms 
These maps are mainly based on later saga sources, from the 13th century. Their historical accuracy has not been established.

See also 

Battle of Svolder
Battle of Hafrsfjord 
Battle of Stiklestad

References

Primary sources 
Andersen, Per Sveaas (1977) Samlingen av Norge og kristningen av landet 800–1130   (Universitetsforlaget) 
Krag, Claus (2000) Norges historie fram til 1319 (Universitetsforlaget)  
Krag, Claus  (1995) Vikingtid og rikssamling 800–1130 (Aschehougs Norgeshistorie)  
Krøger, Jens Flemming (1997) Rikssamlingen: høvdingmakt og kongemakt  (Stavanger:  Dreyer)  
Lidén, Hans-Emil  (1995) Møtet mellom hedendom og kristendom i Norge  (Universitetsforlaget) 
Seip, Jens Arup (1974) Utsikt over Norges historie (Oslo: Gyldendal)

Further reading 
Finlay, Alison  (2004) Fagrskinna, a Catalogue of the Kings of Norway (Brill Academic) 
Hermannsson, Halldór  (2009) Bibliography of the sagas of the kings of Norway and related sagas and tales  (BiblioBazaar) 
Libaek, Ivar; Oivind Stenersen  (1992) History of Norway From The Ice Age To The Oil Age    (Grondahl Dreyer) 
Kouri, E. I., Torkel Jansson and Knut Helle (2003) The Cambridge History of Scandinavia (Cambridge University Press) 
Noyes, David (2010) The History of Norway (Nabu Press) 
Sawyer, Birgit; Sawyer, Peter H.  (1993) Medieval Scandinavia: from Conversion to Reformation, Circa 800–1500 (University of Minnesota Press)

External links 
Rikssamling og kristning  (mennesket.net)
Norway - The First Kingdom (All Empires. Medieval Europe: Political History)

9th century in Norway
Petty kingdoms of Norway

Norway
Geographic history of Norway
Political history of Norway
Harald Fairhair